(originally known as Furi Furi) is a collection of minigames for the Wii. It was developed (along with 505 Games) and published by Taito and was originally planned for a release in Japan for the Wii launch, but was pushed back to April 19, 2007. The minigames are inspired by classic Taito arcade games. Majesco Entertainment published the title in the US on January 16, 2008. There are 2 single-player modes and 3 multi-player modes. It has 30 minigames to play.

Minigames
The game features a variety of minigames. Some include skateboarding, safe cracker and puzzle. Most have references and/or shared gameplay elements with Taito classics.

Reception

The game received "generally unfavorable reviews" according to the review aggregation website Metacritic. In Japan, Famitsu gave it a score of 23 out of 40.

References

External links

2007 video games
505 Games games
Majesco Entertainment games
Minigame compilations
Taito games
Wii games
Wii-only games
Video games developed in Italy
Multiplayer and single-player video games